Melanie Ann Wakefield  is an Australian psychologist and behavioural researcher at the Cancer Council of Victoria. She has worked extensively on cancer prevention including tobacco control, through the introduction of plain-paper packaging.

Academic career 
Wakefield has a BA, GradDip in applied psychology, (1981) MA and PhD (1994) from the University of Adelaide. 

Wakefield has been Director of the Centre for Behavioural Research in Cancer at the Cancer Council of Victoria since 2002.

Wakefield was a member of the Prevention and Community Health Committee of the National Health and Medical Research Council from 2012 to 2015.

She is an honorary professor in the Melbourne School of Psychological Sciences at the University of Melbourne.

Honours and recognition 
Wakefield was elected Fellow of the Academy of Social Sciences in Australia in 2011. She was appointed Officer of the Order of Australia in the 2019 Australia Day Honours for "distinguished service to medical research in the fields of population health and cancer prevention, and as a mentor".

References 

Living people
Year of birth missing (living people)
University of Adelaide alumni
Officers of the Order of Australia
Fellows of the Academy of the Social Sciences in Australia
20th-century psychologists
21st-century psychologists
20th-century Australian scientists
21st-century Australian scientists
20th-century women scientists
21st-century women scientists